Kandukur or Kandukuru may refer to:

 Kandukur, a town in Nellore district (earlier in Prakasam district), Andhra Pradesh, India
 Kandukur revenue division, an administrative division in Nellore district, Andhra Pradesh, India
 Kandukuru, Khammam district, a village in Khammam district, Andhra Pradesh, India
 Kandukur, Ranga Reddy district, a village in Ranga Reddy district, Telangana, India